Mats Wieffer (born 16 November 1999) is a Dutch professional footballer who plays as a midfielder for Eredivisie side Feyenoord.

Club career
Born in Borne, Wieffer played youth football for RKSV NEO aged 5 before joining FC Twente's academy at the age of 10. He made one Derde Divisie appearance for Jong FC Twente in the 2017–18 season, prior to making his professional debut for Twente on 30 October 2018 in a 4–2 KNVB Beker win over VV Noordwijk. He made his league debut in a 2–0 win over TOP Oss in March 2019.

In June 2020, Wieffer joined Excelsior on a free transfer, signing a three-year contract with the club.

In June 2022, Wieffer moved to Feyenoord on a four-year contract. On 13 January 2023, he scored his first goal for the club while also providing an assist in a 3–1 cup win over PEC Zwolle.

International career
On 17 March 2023, Wieffer received his first call-up to the Netherlands senior national team for the Euro 2024 qualifying matches against France and Gibraltar.

References

1999 births
Living people
Dutch footballers
People from Borne, Overijssel
Footballers from Overijssel
Association football midfielders
FC Twente players
Feyenoord players
Excelsior Rotterdam players
Eerste Divisie players
Derde Divisie players
Jong FC Twente players